The 2014 2. divisjon (often referred to as Oddsen-ligaen for sponsorship reasons) was a Norwegian football third-tier league. The league consisted of 56 teams divided into 4 groups of 14 teams. The winners of the four groups were promoted to the 1. divisjon, while the bottom three teams in each groups are relegated to the 3. divisjon.

The league was played as a double round-robin tournament, where all teams played 26 matches. The first round was played on 21 April 2014, while the last round was played on 25 October 2014.

Group 1

Group 2

Group 3

Group 4

References 

Norwegian Second Division seasons
3
Norway
Norway